Peter Jameson (born 21 April 1993) is an English professional footballer who plays as a goalkeeper for Harrogate Town.

Career
Born in Sunderland, Jameson played youth football with Middlesbrough, where he was a 'training goalkeeper' for the first-team players. He later played in non-league football for Consett and Sunderland Ryhope Community Association, before signing for Darlington 1883 in October 2013. He moved on loan to South Shields in March 2017. After 119 league and 12 cup appearances for Darlington, he left the club by mutual consent in August 2017, signing for Blyth Spartans . He moved to York City in June 2019, before signing for Football League club Harrogate Town in May 2022.

References

1993 births
Living people
English footballers
Association football goalkeepers
National League (English football) players
English Football League players
Middlesbrough F.C. players
Consett A.F.C. players
Sunderland Ryhope Community Association F.C. players
Darlington F.C. players
Blyth Spartans A.F.C. players
York City F.C. players
Harrogate Town A.F.C. players